The Montgomery Ward Building or Montgomery Ward and Company Department Store is a historic department store building in downtown Idaho Falls, Idaho, United States.  It currently houses Happy Chinese Restaurant and a number of vacant and occupied offices in the second floor.

See also
Montgomery Ward

References

Historic Buildings - IFDDC

Buildings and structures in Idaho Falls, Idaho
Commercial buildings on the National Register of Historic Places in Idaho
Economy of Idaho
Department stores on the National Register of Historic Places
Montgomery Ward
National Register of Historic Places in Bonneville County, Idaho